Otsego Local School District is a school district in Northwest Ohio. The school district serves students who live in the Wood County villages of Tontogany, Haskins, Grand Rapids, and Weston, Ohio; all or parts of the townships of Grand Rapids, Middleton, Milton, Washington, and Weston; and a small portion of Lucas County in Providence Township. The superintendent is Adam Koch.

Grades 9-12
Otsego High School

Grades 6-8
Otsego Junior High School

Grades K-5
Otsego Elementary School

District Website
 http://www.otsego.k12.oh.us/index.html

School districts in Wood County, Ohio